Moniruzzaman or Maniruzzaman or Muniruzzaman or Manirujjaman is the name of several people, including:

Moniruzzaman (cricketer), cricketer, born 1976
Moniruzzaman (Chittagong Division cricketer), born 1990
A. H. M. Moniruzzaman, diplomat, born 1950
Mohammad Moniruzzaman (1936–2008), writer, freedom fighter, lyricist, professor at University of Dhaka
Maniruzzaman (linguist, University of Chittagong), born 1940
ANM Muniruzzaman, president of the Bangladesh Institute of Peace & Security Studies
ANM Muniruzzaman (1924-1971), professor of Statistics, University of Dhaka, killed in the 1971 Dhaka University massacre

See also

 Maniruzzaman Islamabadi (1875–1950), Islamic philosopher, nationalist activist and journalist from Chittagong